Mariannelund is a locality situated in Hässleby parish in Eksjö Municipality, Jönköping County, in the region of Småland, Sweden with 1,468 inhabitants in 2010.

Mariannelund is situated in the Småland highlands (elevation 118–280 metres above sea level), 39 km east of Eksjö. A railway running from Jönköping by lake Vättern to the Baltic Sea crosses through Mariannelund as well as the coast to coast road number 40. The river Bruza floats through Mariannelund and is part of the greater Em river system. The industry is dominated by forest and building companies.

Together with the neighbouring parish of Kråkshult Mariannelund formed its own municipality (township) until it joined with Eksjö in 1971.

Mariannelund is probably mostly known through the stories of Astrid Lindgren, mostly her books about Emil i Lönneberga. Mariannelund is home to the Doctor, whom the people of the Katthult farm need to visit regularly. The movies based on the books about Emil were filmed in Mariannelund in the beginning of the 1970s.

The nature in and around Mariannelund is hilly and rich in forest. Several peculiar and mighty natural phenomena are to be found in the surroundings. Amongst these are Runkesten, a large rock standing on its edge and most probably the largest rock on earth which can be put into motion by human hand. Other natural phenomena around Mariannelund are several mighty and narrow gorges and the Kvill oak.

Mariannelund grew considerably in the beginning of the 20th century. Heavy industry dominated the town for many years. Since the large paper factory was dismantled in the 1970s, Mariannelund has more and more become a centre for tourism.

References 

Populated places in Jönköping County
Populated places in Eksjö Municipality